Club Mariscal Castilla was a Peruvian football club, located in the city of Lima. The club was founded with the name of Club Mariscal Castilla in honor to the Peruvian caudillo and President of Peru Ramón Castilla and played in Primera Division Peruana from 1958 until 1960.

Honours

National
Peruvian Segunda División: 1
Winners (1): 1957

See also
List of football clubs in Peru
Peruvian football league system

External links
 RSSSF - Peru - List of Champions
 Peruvian football seasons - 1958, 1959, 1960

Football clubs in Lima